The Dirty Youth are a British rock band from South Wales that formed in 2007. The band's line-up consists of singer Danni Monroe, guitarist/keyboardist Matt Bond, guitarist Luke Padfield, bassist Leon Watkins and drummer Jacob Moseley.

They have released 5 studio albums to date, Red Light Fix and Gold Dust via RMR Records. They have toured with the likes of Skindred, The Rasmus, Korn, Alien Ant Farm, InMe, Fozzy and have appeared at festivals such as Download Festival and Hard Rock Calling Festival.

2007: Self-titled EP 
The Dirty Youth was formed in August 2007 by Matt Bond (guitar) and Danni Monroe (vocals). Later that year the duo found Tom Hall (drums) on the Forming Bands website and the trio entered Nott-in-Pill Studios in Newport, Wales to start writing and recording.

They recruited Leon Watkins (bass) and in November, released a 6-track, self-titled EP. The 4-piece recorded a music video and mini documentary, which was featured on ITV's documentary show Unsigned. Following on from the buzz of ITV, music channel Scuzz picked up the video and featured it on their prime time shows generating lots of new fans.

The Dirty Youth then self-booked a 33 date 'toilet circuit' tour of the UK, including an appearance on the Scuzz Stage at Bloodstock Open Air Festival. They then went on to headline their first sold out London show at The Water Rats.

The Dirty Youth continued to tour to promote their EP, which by then had gone on to sell over 2500 hard copies. This was all self-promoted through the band's social networks, big cartel and through touring the UK They had also sold an impressive additional 3000 units on iTunes in that year alone.

Other highlights of 2009 included playing Hellfire Festival at the O2 Academy Islington in London (which is where they met their manager to date) and supporting Skindred at Cardiff University on their sold out UK tour.

During the later part of 2009 they recruited a second guitarist, Luke Padfield.

2010–2013: Red Light Fix 
2010 saw The Dirty Youth enter Nott-in-Pill Studios in Newport again to start writing and recording their debut full-length album Red Light Fix.

During 2010 Matt Bond offered his piano skills to Bullet for My Valentine for their B-side on their new album Fever. He went on to play with them on BBC Radio 1's Live Lounge show with Zane Lowe.

The Dirty Youth's first single "Fight" was released on 4 September 2011, as was a performance music video which debuted on Rock Sound's website. It was later selected as Big Cheese (magazine)'s single of the month.

The video for "Fight" soon went viral and has gone on to receive more than seven million views on YouTube. Red Light Fix was released on 9 October 2011, and shot straight to number 25 in the HMV online download charts. Following on from their success, The Dirty Youth played their first live session for BBC Radio Wales (Bethan Elfyn show).

In 2011 The Dirty Youth supported Finnish rock band Reckless Love during their UK tour. Following this, The Dirty Youth played at Getaway Rock Festival in Sweden alongside Slash and Motörhead, and played the Jägermeister stage at Download Festival UK

In March 2012 The band were invited to join Korn on tour in Europe by the band themselves, after guitarist Munky heard their cover of Narcissistic Cannibal, which was posted online by Metal Hammer Magazine. Following this, they were welcomed back to Download Festival in June to play the Red Bull tent.
Following the success of their first single 'Fight', The Dirty Youth released their second single and video for 'Rise Up', which featured cameos from Michael Paget from Bullet For My Valentine and Benji Webbe from Skindred.

In July 2012, drummer Tom Hall parted ways with the band. They went on to announce Phil Edwards as their new drummer along with an appearance at Hard Rock Calling Festival in Hyde Park, London alongside Bruce Springsteen.
In August, The Dirty Youth then went on to play at Merthyr Rocks Festival in Wales and shortly after, released their third single and video for 'Last Confession'.

In September 2012, The Dirty Youth announced that they would be main support to The Rasmus in November/December on their 28 date European tour.
November 2012 saw The Dirty Youth very quickly hit their target of £9000 through Pledge Music, for the release of their tour DVD 28 Gigs Later. The footage was filmed by the band themselves throughout their tour supporting The Rasmus and was released in January 2013.
During The Rasmus tour, The Dirty Youth sold a staggering 80,000 units of their debut album Red Light Fix.

In January 2013, The Dirty Youth released a Special Deluxe Edition of Red Light Fix featuring 5 bonus tracks.

In March 2013, the third single and video "Requiem Of The Drunk" was released, for which the video featured a collation of tour footage with The Rasmus and Korn.
In May 2013, The Dirty Youth supported Chevelle at the O2 Academy Islington in London, then in July 2013 The Dirty Youth played at Rockfest in Czech Republic alongside The Rasmus.

During the latter part of 2013 and after two years of touring Red Light Fix, The Dirty Youth headed to Rockfield Studios in Monmouth to start writing their second album Gold Dust.

In December 2013 The Dirty Youth played to a sold out Christmas show in their hometown of Cardiff which resulted in the police being called after a roit was reported.

2014–2016: Gold Dust 
In January 2014 The Dirty Youth released a performance based video for "Alive" which would be the band's first single ahead of the album release. The video is featured on the Most Wanted chart on Scuzz and Kerrang! Buzz Chart.

On 12 March The Dirty Youth announced through their Facebook page that they would be releasing another tour DVD called The Dirty Youth Project, this time also including studio footage of the recording process of the next album. They would be using the Kickstarter campaign to fund this.

March 2014 saw The Dirty Youth tour Europe with Heaven's Basement and Glamour of the Kill and on 23 March 2014, The Dirty Youth played Takedown Festival in Southampton.

On 23 March 2014 The Dirty Youth released the first single "Alive" ahead of the album release. In April 2014 The Dirty Youth were featured as Introducing Stars in Kerrang! Magazine.

In June 2014 The Dirty Youth announced through their Facebook that their drummer Phil Edwards was parting ways with the band. Freddie Green was later announced as their new drummer.

The Dirty Youth then went on to play the Second Stage at Download Festival in front of 70,000 people in June 2014.

In July 2014 The Dirty Youth played at Redfest alongside Skindred and later announced their first ever UK headline tour for October with I Divide as their support band.

With a solid line-up in place, the band went back to Rockfield Studios to finish recording the album. They raised funds for Gold Dust through Kickstarter and reached their goal in November 2014.

In March 2015 The Dirty Youth supported Fozzy on their European and UK tour.
The next single from Gold Dust, "The One", was released on 6 April 2015 with a video concept set in the future of 2069. "A cybernetic alien species has invaded Earth outlawing the human art of dance". It was featured as Single Of The Week on Kerrang Radio. The video was also premiered on Kerrang!'s website.

In May 2015 The Dirty Youth supported InMe on their UK tour and played at Camden Rocks Festival in London.Gold Dust was released on 11 May, receiving high critical acclaim including a 4K review in Kerrang!.

In August 2015 it was announced that The Dirty Youth will be playing two Halloween shows; one in Exeter on 30 October with Young Guns and one on 31 October in Cardiff with Skindred

On 30 September 2015 The Dirty Youth announced that they would be supporting Alien Ant Farm and InMe on their European tour in January 2016.

On 9 October 2015 The Dirty Youth announced that they would be releasing a double A-side single for 'Just Move On' and a cover of Blondie's hit 'Atomic' on 13 November 2015. This announcement comes with the news of 2 music video's to accompany each single.

On 6 November 2015 Kerrang! magazine showcased the video for "Just Move On".

In December 2015, The Dirty Youth announced another pledge campaign, this time called 'Star Tours'. This will include footage from their up-and-coming tour with Alien Ant Farm and InMe also footage from their tour with Fozzy earlier in the year.

In January 2016 The Dirty Youth supported Alien Ant Farm and InMe on their European tour.

In August 2016, The Dirty Youth Signed to Uprawr/Notting Hill Publishing and announced on some of their social media pages that they had started demoing their, as yet 'untitled' third album.

They also appeared for the 4th time at Download Festival in Castle Donington.

 2017: new single 
On 6 February 2017, Music Week announced that new label Marshall Records has announced their first signing as The Dirty Youth. The band headed to Abbey Road Studios later that week to start recording. The first single, "Hurricane", was released in September 2017.

 Touring 
In 2011 The Dirty Youth supported Finnish rock band Reckless Love during their UK tour, played at Download Festival in the U.K and Getaway Rocks Festival in Sweden.

In 2012 The Dirty Youth toured Europe with Korn and were invited back to play Download Festival for the second year running and played Hard Rock Calling Festival at Hyde Park in London, alongside Bruce Springsteen. The Dirty Youth also played at Merthyr Rocks Festival in Wales and toured for two months in Europe with The Rasmus.

In 2013 The Dirty Youth supported Chevelle at the Islington Academy in London, then in July 2013 The Dirty Youth played at Rockfest in Czech Republic alongside The Rasmus.
In December 2013 The Dirty Youth played to a sold out Christmas show in their hometown of Cardiff at The Moon Club.

2014 saw The Dirty Youth tour Europe with Heaven's Basement and Glamour of the Kill then go on to play Takedown Festival in Southampton.
In June The Dirty Youth played the Second Stage at Download Festival in front of 10,000 people.
In July 2014 The Dirty Youth played at Redfest alongside Skindred and announced their first ever UK headline tour for October with I Divide as their support band.

In March 2015 The Dirty Youth supported Fozzy on their European and UK tour. Then in May 2015, The Dirty Youth supported InMe on their UK tour and played at the Camden Rocks Festival in London.

In August 2015 it was announced that The Dirty Youth will be playing two Halloween shows; one in Exeter on 30 October with Young Guns and one on 31 October in Cardiff with Skindred

On 30 September 2015, The Dirty Youth announced that they would be supporting Alien Ant Farm and InMe on their European tour in January 2016.

On 19 May 2016, The Dirty Youth announced their confirmed slot at Download Festival on Sunday 12 June 2016 where they will perform on the Maverick Stage, and their appearance at Camden Rocks Festival in London on Saturday 4 June at The Crowndale.

In April 2018, The Dirty Youth toured Switzerland (13.04. Chur, Palazzo, 14.04. Interlaken, Goldener Anker, 15.04. Aarburg, Musigburg), supported by the Swiss rock band Sinside from Zürich.

 Musical style 
The band has stated that their music style is "blending rock anthems with punk attitude and electronica".

 Band members 
Current members
Danni Monroe – lead vocals (2009–present)
Matt Bond – lead guitar, piano, keytar, backing vocals (2009–present)
Leon Watkins – bass (2009–present)
Luke Padfield – rhythm guitar (2009–present)
Jacob Moseley – drums (2018–present)
Previous members
Freddie Green – drums (2014–2018)
 Phil Edwards – drums (2012–2014)
 Tom Hall – drums (2009–2012)

 Discography 

 Studio albums 
 Red Light Fix (2011)
 Gold Dust (2015)
 Utopia (2019)
  Project: 19'' (2020)

Extended plays

Singles

Live DVDs

References 

Musical groups established in 2007
Musical quintets
Welsh rock music groups
Female-fronted musical groups